Café Bleu is the official debut album released by the English band The Style Council. It was released on 16 March 1984, on Polydor Records, produced by Paul Weller with Peter Wilson. It followed the compilation Introducing The Style Council, which was released only in the Netherlands, Canada and Japan. The album was mainly recorded at Solid Bond Studios (owned by Weller) except for the strings which were recorded at CBS.

Café Bleu was renamed My Ever Changing Moods in the United States to capitalise on the success of the single of the same name. Café Bleu included a large number of extra musicians, known as Honorary Councillors, including Tracey Thorn and Ben Watt from Everything but the Girl. The album represented a huge shift away from Weller's previous group The Jam and towards incorporating his favoured elements of classic soul, jazz and rap.

Critical reception

In a retrospective review, Stephen Thomas Erlewine of AllMusic found that Café Bleu, although being indicative of "the group's fatal flaw – a tendency to be too eclectic and overambitious", is nonetheless "one of their better efforts", praising Weller's "solid soul-tinged pop songs, including 'My Ever Changing Moods,' 'Headstart for Happiness,' 'You're the Best Thing,' and 'Here's One That Got Away.'"

Café Bleu was included in the book 1001 Albums You Must Hear Before You Die. Treble included it in a 2014 list of 10 essential sophisti-pop albums, saying that while it does not feature synthesizers like the other albums on the list, "a mix of blue-eyed soul, jazz, and modern influences (for the time at least) made this record a sophisticated, progressive piece of pop."

Track listing
All songs written by Paul Weller, except where noted.

Side one
 "Mick's Blessings" (Mick Talbot) – 1:15
 "The Whole Point of No Return" – 2:40
 "Me Ship Came In!" – 3:06
 "Blue Café" – 2:15
 "The Paris Match" – 4:25
 "My Ever Changing Moods" – 3:37
 "Dropping Bombs on the Whitehouse" (Weller, Talbot) – 3:15

Side two
 "A Gospel" – 4:44
 "Strength of Your Nature" – 4:20
 "You're the Best Thing" – 5:40
 "Here's One That Got Away" – 2:35
 "Headstart for Happiness" – 3:20
 "Council Meetin'" (Weller, Talbot) – 2:29

Additional track listing

Personnel
The Style Council
 Paul Weller – vocals, guitar; bass on "Me Ship Came In!", "Dropping Bombs on the Whitehouse" and "Council Meetin'", synthesizer on "Strength of Your Nature", flute sound on "Council Meetin'"
 Mick Talbot – keyboards, piano, Hammond organ; brass synthesizer on "Strength of Your Nature", bass synthesizer on "You're the Best Thing", brass sound on "Headstart for Happiness", Clavinet on "Council Meetin'"
 Steve White – drums, percussion
with:
 Billy Chapman – saxophone on "Me Ship Came In!", "You're the Best Thing" and "Dropping Bombs on the Whitehouse"
 Barbara Snow – trumpet on "Me Ship Came In!", "Dropping Bombs on the Whitehouse", "A Gospel" and "Headstart for Happiness"
 Randy Anderson – guitar
 Tracey Thorn – vocals on "The Paris Match"
 Chris Bostock – double bass on "The Paris Match", bass on "Here's One That Got Away"
 Ben Watt – guitar on "The Paris Match"
 Dizzi Heights (Brian Beaton) – rap on "A Gospel"
 Hilary Seabrook – saxophone on "A Gospel" and "Headstart for Happiness"
 Dee C. Lee – backing vocals on "Strength of Your Nature" and co-vocals on "Headstart for Happiness"
 Bobby Valentino – violin on "Here's One That Got Away"
 Pete Wilson – drum programming on "A Gospel" and "Strength of Your Nature"

Charts

Weekly charts

Year-end charts

Certifications

References

External links

 Café Bleu (Adobe Flash) at Radio3Net (streamed copy where licensed)
 

1984 debut albums
The Style Council albums
Polydor Records albums
Progressive pop albums